Zaz (a backronym for "Zaz ain't Z***") is a free software (GPLv3) puzzle video game which is similar to Zuma.

Gameplay 
The goal is to remove all incoming marbles by rearranging their order and making triplets or quartets of the same color. The game features 23 levels and is reportedly harder than the original Zuma. In each of the levels there are some special items, for example marked balls that explode more than just the normal three balls.

Unlike Zuma, where the player shoots new balls from a center point, in Zaz the player moves a grabber on a separate track on the playfield to grab a ball that can then be shot back at a new location.
Instead of inserting randomly assigned new balls, the player moves existing balls.

Reception 
The game is available in Linux distributions, such as Ubuntu, Fedora and Debian repositories as the game's content complies with the DFSG. This was achieved after replacing the CC BY-NC-SA licensed NIN soundtracks in versions after 0.2.6.
Between 2010 and 2016 Zaz was downloaded from SourceForge directly 100,000 times. The game was positively reviewed by German computer web sites Chip.de and Computer Bild. The Chip.de review described the game as '"Very well made clone of the original classical game. Zaz implements the game idea perfectly and offers challenging levels".

References

External links

 
 Source code

Puzzle video games
2009 video games
Free software programmed in Perl
GP2X games
MacOS games
Windows games
Linux games
Video game clones
Java platform games
Open-source video games
Android (operating system) games
Windows Phone games
Free and open-source Android software